State Highway 172 (SH 172) is a  long state highway in southwestern Colorado. SH 172's southern terminus is at New Mexico State Road 511 (NM 511) at the New Mexico state line, and the northern terminus is at U.S. Route 160 (US 160) southeast of Durango.

Route description
SH 172 begins in the south at the New Mexico state line where the road becomes NM 511. From there, the route travels through the Southern Ute Indian Reservation northward through Ignacio where it meets the western end of SH 151. From Ignacio, the road gradually arcs to the west and passes westward through Falfa before again turning northward to meet its northern end at a junction with US 160 approximately eight miles southeast of Durango.

History
The route was established in the 1930s, when it connected US 160 to Arboles. The route was paved from US 160 to Ignacio by 1954 and to Arboles by 1960. The southern end of the road was changed to the New Mexico state line by 1972.

Major intersections

References

External links

172
Transportation in La Plata County, Colorado